Chris Myers (born 1959) is an American sports broadcaster.

Chris or Christopher Myers may also refer to:
Chris Myers (American football) (born 1981), American football player
Chris Myers (footballer) (born 1969), English former professional footballer
Chris Myers (New Jersey politician) (born 1965), American business executive and politician
Christopher Myers, author and illustrator of children's books
Chris John Myers, electronics engineer
Christopher "Chris" Myers, a fictional character in The Promise (2016)